Empis variegata is a species of dance flies, in the fly family Empididae. It is included in the subgenus Leptempis. It is found from the Benelux, through Germany to Switzerland, Austria, the Czech Republic, Slovakia and Hungary. It has also been recorded from central Russia.

References

External links
Fauna Europaea

Empis
Asilomorph flies of Europe
Insects described in 1804